The Jewish quarter of Toledo is a district of the city of Toledo, in Castile-La Mancha, Spain. It was the neighborhood in which the Jews lived in the Middle Ages, although they were not obliged to live within it.

It is the Jewish community of Toledo which became, in the 12th and 13th centuries, the most populous and rich of the Kingdom of Castile. And coexists for centuries, more or less peacefully, with Muslims and Christians, in which it would be called city of the three cultures.

Description

The quarter can be reached through a gate. One of the many entrances is the gate Puerta de Assulca, which has in its vicinity in flea market where oil, butter, chickpeas, lentils and everything necessary for daily life are sold.

Then it enters the streets, adarves (dead-end streets) and squares of the quarter. The main street is called Calle del Mármol and connects the Jewish quarter with the rest of the city.

There is a market, places to pray, public baths, bread ovens, palaces and a wall. Near the Tagus river is the neighborhood Barrio del Degolladero, so named because here was the designated place for the ritual slaughter (shechitah) of beef-cattle. 

In the neighborhood Barrio de Hamazelt the richest Jewish families lived and in the street known today as San Juan de Dios, lived the best known Jew of Toledo: Samuel ha-Levi. He was the treasurer of the king Peter of Castile and ordered the building of a big synagogue, that later was known as the "Synagogue of el Tránsito". And as in all the Jewish houses, features a mezuzah containing passages from Deuteronomy affixed to its door-post. In Jewish tradition the mezuzah is believed to protect the home.

Two Jewish places of worship are preserved today (both as museums), Santa María la Blanca (formerly the Synagogue of Ibn Shushan ) and El Tránsito. In a bygone age, every Friday before sunset, a rabbi sounded the shofar (a goat's horn) three times announcing the arrival of the Sabbath, a weekly holiday for the Jews, who rested while the rest of the city continued with its usual bustle.

Near each synagogue there is an underground bath called mikveh. The Jewish women came here to ritually purify themselves after menstruation and childbirth. The mikveh was also for gentile bought cooking vessels, which were considered non-kosher upon purchase and required immersion in its waters before use.

References

Jewish ghettos in Europe
Jews and Judaism in Toledo, Spain